More than a Vote is a nonprofit organization fighting for African-Americans's voting rights, as well as advocating criminal justice reform in the United States. It was founded in June 2020, amid the Black Lives Matter protests following the murders of Breonna Taylor and George Floyd, by NBA basketball player LeBron James and other black athletes and entertainers. More Than a Vote works with non-partisan VoteRiders to spread state-specific information on voter ID requirements.

See also 
 Voter suppression in the United States

References

Further reading 
 
 

2020 establishments in the United States
Non-profit organizations based in the United States